The nitridoborates are chemical compounds of boron and nitrogen with metals. These compounds are typically produced at high temperature by reacting hexagonal boron nitride (α -BN) with metal nitrides or by metathesis reactions involving nitridoborates.  A wide range of these compounds have been made involving lithium, alkaline earth metals and lanthanides, and their structures determined using crystallographic techniques such as X-ray crystallography. Structurally one of their interesting features is the presence of polyatomic anions of boron and nitrogen where the geometry and the B–N bond length have been interpreted in terms of π-bonding.

Many of the compounds produced  can be described as ternary compounds of metal boron and nitrogen and examples of these are Li3BN2, Mg3BN3, La3B3N6, La5B4N9. However there are examples of compounds with more than one metal, for example La3Ni2B2N3 and compounds containing anions such as Cl−, for example Mg2BN2Cl.

Structures and bonding
Examination of the crystallographic data shows the presence of polyatomic units consisting of boron and nitrogen. These units have structures similar to those of isoelectronic anions, which have π-bonded structures.  The bonding in some of these compounds is ionic in character, such as Ca3[BN2]2, other compounds have metallic characteristics, where the bonding has been described in terms of π-bonded anions with extra electrons in anti-bonding orbitals that not only cause a lengthening of the B–N bonds but also form  part of the conduction band of the solid. The simplest ion BNn− is comparable to the  ion, but attempts to prepare the compound CaBN analogous to CaC2 calcium carbide failed. The bonding of compounds containing the diatomic BN anion have been explained in terms of electrons entering anti-bonding orbitals and reducing the B–N bond order from 3 (triple bond) in BN2− to 2 (double bond) in BN4−.

Some nitridoborates are salt-like such as Li3BN2, LiCa4[BN2]3 others have a metallic lustre, such as LiEu4[BN2]3.  Bonding calculations  show that the energy of the valence orbitals of metal atoms of group 2 and lanthanide elements are higher than those of the bonding orbitals in BNx ions which indicates an ionic like interaction between a metal atom and a BNx ion. With lanthanide compounds where extra electrons enter the anti-bonding orbitals of an ion there can be a smaller band gap giving the compounds metal like properties such as lustre. With transition metals the d orbitals can be similar in energy to bonding orbitals in the BN anions suggesting covalent interactions.

For comparison purposes the following are considered to be typical BN bond lengths

References

Boron–nitrogen compounds
Anions